The Philippine  jungle flycatcher (Cyornis ruficauda) is a species of passerine bird in the Old World flycatcher family Muscicapidae.
It is endemic to the Philippines.
Its natural habitat is subtropical or tropical moist montane forests.

This species was previously placed in the genus Rhinomyias but was moved to Cyornis based on the results of a 2010 molecular phylogenetic study. The Sulu jungle flycatcher (C. ocularis), which is endemic to the Sulu Archipelago, and the Crocker jungle flycatcher (C. ruficrissa), which is endemic to Borneo, were split as distinct species by the IOC in 2021. With the split, this species was renamed from rufous-tailed jungle flycatcher to Philippine jungle flycatcher.

References

Cyornis
Birds described in 1877
Taxonomy articles created by Polbot

Endemic birds of the Philippines